Risalapur is a town located in the Punjab province of Pakistan. It is located at 31°9'0N 73°11'0E with an altitude of 171 metres (564 feet). Neighbouring settlements include Chhajwali and Rurki.

References

Populated places in Lahore District